Ranger Bill is a Christian radio program from the 1950s, produced by Moody Radio.  With over 200 episodes produced, Ranger Bill stars Miron Canaday as the title character and Stumpy Jenkins and Ed Ronne, Sr as Grey Wolf. The main character, Ranger Bill, is a forest ranger located in the town of Knotty Pine along the Rocky Mountains. The show describes the various tales of the adventures of Ranger Bill and his friends.

Radio Program
The Moody Bible Institute originally aired on October 2, 1950 in 15 minute episodes.  The series later aired in half-hour episode format, with the earliest known episode airing May 14, 1954.  The series continued through 1964, and was later syndicated through to the present in 30 minute episodes.

Crew
Charles Christensen - director
Jim Grant - director
Joal Hanson- writer
John Rowan - writer
John McCombe - sound effects

Character Universe

Main characters
Bill Jefferson is the chief forest ranger.  He lives with his mother in the small town of Knotty Pine.  He's described as a well-built leader capable of accomplishing nearly anything.
Stumpy Jenkins, another forest ranger, is often referred to as "The Old Timer".  Known for his superb marksmanship, he likes to tell jokes and travel around with his rifle.  A good description of his rifle is given in the episode "The Prehistoric Monster".
Henry Scott is the teenage ward of Ranger Bill, who helps out in many park ranger tasks.
Gray Wolf is a Native American of the Dakota tribe, and also a forest ranger.  Although he talks in broken English,  he is knowledgeable in both modern forest management and the traditional ways of his people. Drawing on both, he makes a valuable contribution to the rangers.

Minor characters
Ralph, a forest ranger.
Sheriff Cal, the county sheriff
Jo Jo, a friend of Henry's
Pat O'Roark, Knotty Pine's chief of police.
Frenchy DeSalle, chief lumberjack in the area.
Colonel Anders, Ranger Bill's boss.
Moose McBain, a local fur trapper.
Maggie Murphy, Stumpy's housekeeper in "The Battle At Jenkins Manor" and cook at summer camp in "Mrs. Murphy's Chowder" and also {cook} aboard the "River Giant."
George Benton, Replaces Col. Anders temporarily in "The Hard Head."
Jane Reeves, Fire watcher in "Petticoat Rangers."
Jock McIntosh, Knotty Pine's blacksmith in "The Wrong Valley."
Annie McIntosh, Jock's wife. Also appears in "The Wrong Valley."
Dutch Vanderhaven, Knotty Pine's own version of "The Self-Made Man."
Mary Lu, a friend of Henry's in "Mystery Island" and "The Measure of a Man."
Alec, a friend of Henry's in "Water tower Rescue" "He broke through the Ice" and "The bomb shelter

Location Universe
Knotty Pine, the central focus of the Ranger Bill series.
Junction City, a town about an hour from Knotty Pine and comparable in size.
Border Town, a town of questionable character located just outside the park rangers' jurisdiction.
Central City, the nearest major city to Knotty Pine.

Listen Online 
https://archive.org/details/OTRR_Ranger_Bill_Singles

List of episodes

Opening Lines
Intro 1
"Ranger Bill, Warrior of the Woodland, struggling against extreme odds, traveling dangerous trails, fighting the many enemies of nature. This is the job of the guardian of the forest, Ranger Bill. Pouring rain, freezing cold, blistering heat, snows, floods, bears, rattlesnakes, mountain lions. Yes, all this in exchange for the satisfaction and pride of a job well done."

Intro 2
"Ranger Bill, Warrior of the Woodland, struggling against extreme odds, traveling dangerous trails, showing rare courage in the face of disaster, in the air, on horseback, or in a screaming squad car. Ranger Bill, his mind alert, a ready smile, unswerving, loyal to his mission. And all this in exchange for the satisfaction and pride of a job well done."

References 
 Moody Radio
 https://www.webcitation.org/query?url=http://www.geocities.com/rangerbillclub/billshow.htm&date=2009-10-26+01:25:29

External links
 Moody Radio
 Ranger Bill Fan Club

American radio dramas
1950s American radio programs
1960s American radio programs